Supernova is a 2020 British romantic drama film written and directed by Harry Macqueen. The film stars Colin Firth and Stanley Tucci.

Supernova had its world premiere at the 68th San Sebastián International Film Festival on 22 September 2020 and was released in the United States on 29 January 2021, by Bleecker Street, and in the United Kingdom on 25 June 2021, by StudioCanal.

Plot
Sam and Tusker, romantic partners for 20 years and amateur astronomers, undertake a road trip in a campervan across England to the Lake District, to visit some of their favorite spots and for a reunion with friends and family. Tusker has been diagnosed with early onset dementia, with his progressing illness putting a strain on their relationship. He is in the middle of writing a book, but is struggling with it, refusing to show it to Sam. Sam is a pianist/composer preparing for what he says will be his final piano concert.

The pair arrive at Sam’s sister’s house, where the rest of their family and friends later gather for a party in their honor. During subsequent conversation with one of their friends, Sam finds out Tusker has been having difficulties writing. Sam heads into their camper van and discovers in his journal that Tusker’s writing has been declining steadily over time. He also discovers that Tusker has a vial of pentobarbital and has made a farewell audio tape, explaining that he intends to take his own life. Sam says nothing.

The pair head to a leased cottage in the countryside. Sam confronts Tusker about his discovery and plays the tape to him, revealing Tusker’s plans to die by suicide before his dementia becomes too severe. Sam strongly and pleadingly argues with him against this idea, to no avail. They make up the next day and have an intimate night together. The next morning, as Sam plays the piano, he lets Tusker know that he accepts his decision and wants to be at his side when it happens.

In the final scene, Sam appears on stage, playing the beautiful piano piece that Tusker loved so well.

Cast
 Colin Firth as Sam
 Stanley Tucci as Tusker Mulliner
 Pippa Haywood as Lilly
 Peter MacQueen as Clive
 James Dreyfus as Tim
 Ian Drysdale as Paul
 Sarah Woodward as Sue

Production
In October 2019, it was announced Colin Firth and Stanley Tucci had joined the cast of the film, with Harry Macqueen directing from a screenplay he wrote, with StudioCanal distributing in the United Kingdom. The film's soundtrack was written and recorded by Keaton Henson.

Release
The film had its world premiere at the 68th San Sebastián International Film Festival on 22 September 2020, and was released in the United Kingdom on 25 June 2021, by StudioCanal. In October 2020, Bleecker Street acquired U.S. distribution rights to the film and released it in the United States on 29 January 2021.
It was selected in official competition at London Film Festival, San Sebastian Film Festival and Rome Film festival in 2020.

Reception
Review aggregator website Rotten Tomatoes reports that  of  critic reviews are positive for the film. Critics consensus on the website reads, "Led by moving performances from Colin Firth and Stanley Tucci, Supernova is a heartbreaking look at the emotional toll that comes with accepting mortality." Metacritic calculated a weighted average score of 73 out of 100, based on 31 reviews, citing "generally favorable reviews".

It was a 'Critic's Pick' in The New York Times with Glenn Kenny calling the film "spectacularly moving". The Washington Post gave it four stars out of four. Justin Chang from Los Angeles Times said the film "shouldn't be missed".

The film was short-listed for two BAFTA Awards in the UK in 2021 including Best British Feature.

It was selected in the Best Feature category at the European Film Awards in 2021.

In 2022, Supernova was voted as one of the 'Best British Films of the 21st Century' in a poll by critics.

References

External links
 

2020 films
2020 romantic drama films
2020 LGBT-related films
2020s drama road movies
British drama road movies
British romantic drama films
British LGBT-related films
BBC Film films
StudioCanal films
Bleecker Street films
2020 independent films
Films about dementia
Films set in England
Films shot in Cumbria
LGBT-related romantic drama films
Gay-related films
2020s English-language films
2020s British films
2020s French films